Legalease Ltd. is a global legal research and publishing company founded in the UK in 1987. The company assesses global law firms and lawyers for its publications, annual lists and guides, including Legal Business, GC Magazine and The Legal 500 series.

Overview
Legalease Ltd. is a publishing and legal analytics firm based in the United Kingdom,

The company was founded by its first editor-in-chief, John M. Pritchard. Since 2015, the managing director is David Goulthorpe, with David Burgess as publishing director. The company is a London living wage employer.

Publications include Legal Business Magazine. Its GC Powerlist, (formerly the "Corporate Counsel 100"), publishes annually, which includes its 500 top-rated lawyers in various regions of the world.

The company was criticized in 2020, alongside its competitor Chambers and Partners, for taking advantage of the U.K. government furlough scheme in response to the COVID-19 pandemic in the United Kingdom, despite strong sales.

Legal Business
Legal Business magazine temporarily ceased publishing and shuttered operations in April 2020.

The Legal 500
The Legal 500 series is considered to be the largest legal referral guide in the world. Publications include editorials and GC Magazine for general counsel practitioners, offering resources for in-house lawyers, such as client insight reports.it also  hosts live events and roundtables; and aggregates legal news.

Rankings in The Legal 500 are reported as merit-based, relying on both publicly available information and law firm self-reported information, and are published on the company's website. The company also issues several annual awards, such as The Legal 500 Awards, and recognizes lawyers with various accolades, including its "GC Powerlist" designations.

See also
 Chambers and Partners

References

External links
  The Legal 500
  Legalease Ltd

Books by publishing company of the United Kingdom
International law literature
International rankings